Surmaq Rural District is a rural district (dehestan) in the Central District of Abadeh County, Fars Province, Iran. At the 2016 census, its population was 3,050, in 1,018 families. At the 2006 census, its population was 388, in 118 families.  The rural district has 10 villages.

References 

Rural Districts of Fars Province
Abadeh County